Al-Hilli is an Arabic surname. Notable people with the surname include:
 al-Allama al-Hilli (1250–1325), theologian 
 Safi al-Din al-Hilli (1278–1349), poet
 al-Hilli family, victims of the Annecy shootings of 2012

Arabic-language surnames
Surnames of Egyptian origin
Surnames of Bahraini origin